Patrick Field may refer to:
 Patrick Field (athlete)
 Patrick Field (judge)